Stagecoach in Mansfield is a bus operator providing bus services in Mansfield and surrounding areas. It is a subsidiary of Stagecoach East Midlands, a subdivision of the Stagecoach Group.

They have around 60 buses and 200 employees who carry more than 6 million passengers per year, with a passenger increase of approximately 7%.

As well as Mansfield, they also operate certain buses to Nottingham, Chesterfield, Sutton-in-Ashfield, Bolsover, Eckington, Sheffield, Langwith, Edwinstowe, and Newark-on-Trent. Although most routes operate all week, some routes do not operate on Sundays, and some routes only operate on Sundays. On bank holidays, a Sunday service is operated.

Stagecoach in Mansfield operate the 'pronto' service between Nottingham and Chesterfield via Mansfield. The service was previously operated using high-specification single deckers before it was upgraded to double-decker operation in a £3 million investment in 2018.

The service was previously jointly operated between Stagecoach and trentbarton; from 15 February 2020, trentbarton ceased operations on the route, resulting in Stagecoach now operating the entire 'pronto' network, coinciding with another £1.1 million investment of branded double-deckers to replace trentbarton's services.

Depot
 Mansfield (Sutton Road)

References

External links

Route map of the area covered by services in the Stagecoach in Mansfield area
More information about Stagecoach in Mansfield.

Stagecoach Group bus operators in England
Bus operators in Nottinghamshire